A skort is a pair of shorts with an overlapping fabric panel made to resemble a skirt covering the front and back, or a skirt with a pair of integral shorts hidden underneath (also can be called sport skirts) .

History

While some garments sold as culottes resemble short trousers, to be skorts they need to look like skirts. They are distinguished from trousers or shorts by a fuller cut at the bottom (hem) than at the waist.

Initially called "trouser skirts," skorts were developed to provide more freedom to do activities (such as sports, gardening, cleaning, or bike riding), and give the appearance of a skirt. At first, skorts were not deemed appropriate to be worn during any non-athletic activity.

Montgomery Ward claimed in their 1959 Spring/Summer catalog to have invented the garment they called a skort.  It was a short knife or accordion pleated skirt with an attached bloomer underneath.  Years later, the term was applied to a pair of shorts with a flap of fabric across the front (and often the back) making the garment appear to be a skirt.  In recent years, the term skort has been given to any skirt with an attached pair of shorts.

Predecessors 
The origins of skorts may be related back to earlier garments like bloomers and jupe-culottes which grew in popularity in the late 19th century and early 20th century, despite common public disapproval for women wearing pants. In 1911, Paul Poiret produced several designs that were a combination of skirts and trousers, and they became known as jupe-culottes or as harem pants. Similar to skorts, culottes involve various styles that may appear as a hybrid between pants and skirts. Skorts are distinguished by their construction as a pair of shorts with material over it to make it appear as a skirt.

Women's sports
Skorts are popular in sports such as field hockey, tennis, golf, ten-pin bowling and camogie, and are often part of girls' athletic uniforms.

The first noted skort-like clothing to be worn as tennis attire was done so by the Spanish player, Lilí Álvarez, who wore a pair of culottes which had been shaped to resemble a skirt during her Wimbledon match in 1931.

See also

 Women and trousers

References

Skirts
Trousers and shorts
2000s fashion
2010s fashion